Hübl is a surname. Notable people with the surname include:
Arthur von Hübl (1853–1932), Austrian military officer, chemist and cartographer
Hübl Peak in Antarctica named after Arthur von Hübl
Jaroslav Hübl (disambiguation), multiple people
Viktor Hübl (born 1978), Czech ice hockey player

German toponymic surnames